K. M. George may refer to:
 K. M. George (politician), political leader and founder of Kerala Congress
 K. M. George (writer), Malayalam writer, scholar and literary critic
 Kayalakakam M. George, banker and former CEO of Palai Central Bank